This list contains abstractions used in computer programming.

Notes

References 

Abstraction
Programming language concepts